Mumias Sugar was a Kenyan football club formed in 1977 and based in Mumias. The home stadium was Mumias Sports Complex. It was a member of the top division in Kenyan football, but the club was disbanded midway of the 2007 season.

The club won the Kenyan President's Cup in 1996 and 1999, though the latter was revoked due to a match fixing-scandal.

The club was owned by the Mumias Sugar Company.

Achievements
Kenyan President's Cup: 2
 1996, 1999
The club also won the Kenya Premier League 1999 but was handed to Tusker after they celebrated with their opponents on the last day allegedly claiming it was matchfixing.

Legends
Chris Kimuyu, Evans Alemba, Mark Sirengo, Eric Lumiti, Bernard Onyango, Andrew Kortok, Patrick Mugata, Nick Yakhama, and Steve 'Kush'Okumu.

Performance in Confederation of African Football competitions
CAF Cup Winners' Cup: 1 appearance
1997 – First Round

CAF Cup: 1 appearance
1999 – First Round

References

Defunct football clubs in Kenya
Association football clubs established in 1977
Association football clubs disestablished in 2007
Sport in Western Province (Kenya)
Mumias
1977 establishments in Kenya
2007 disestablishments in Kenya
Works association football clubs in Kenya